The Appeal of 18 June was the first speech made by Charles de Gaulle after his arrival in London in 1940 following the Battle of France. Broadcast to Vichy France by the radio services of the British Broadcasting Corporation (BBC), it is often considered to have marked the beginning of the French Resistance in World War II. It is regarded as one of the most important speeches in French history. In spite of its significance in French collective memory, historians have shown that the appeal was heard only by a minority of French people. De Gaulle's 22 June 1940 speech was more widely heard. The historic importance of these radio broadcasts and de Gaulle's future status as the emblem of the French resistance gave de Gaulle the nickname  (The Man of 18 June).

Context
De Gaulle had recently been promoted to the rank of brigadier general and named as under-secretary of state for national defence and war by Prime Minister Paul Reynaud during the German invasion of France. Reynaud resigned after his proposal for a Franco-British Union was rejected by his cabinet and Marshal Philippe Pétain, a hero of World War I, became the new prime minister, pledging to sign an armistice with Nazi Germany. De Gaulle opposed any such action and, facing imminent arrest, fled France on 17 June. Other leading politicians, including Georges Mandel, Léon Blum, Pierre Mendès France, Jean Zay and Édouard Daladier (and separately Reynaud), were arrested while travelling to continue the war from North Africa.

De Gaulle arrived in London on the afternoon of 17 June and met with Winston Churchill. The British prime minister had a good opinion of de Gaulle from their three previous meetings, and gave permission to make a speech to France. De Gaulle finished his speech on the morning of 18 June, but did not know that the British government almost revoked permission. London hoped to persuade the Pétain government in Bordeaux to send the French Navy away from German use, and individual French politicians to leave France, so worried about a speech criticizing the French government. Having sent three separate simultaneous delegations to Bordeaux, it decided that the speech would not confuse things further.

Ignorant of the British debate over his speech, de Gaulle arrived at the BBC at 6 pm BST to record the four-minute speech. After final permission arrived at 8 pm, the speech was broadcast at 10 pm BST (8 pm in Paris) on BBC Radio from Broadcasting House over France. BBC repeated the broadcast four more times the next day.

De Gaulle's speech stated that superior German arms and tactics had defeated the French military. The defeat was not complete because France still had its colonies, the British Empire as its ally, and help from the United States; this was a world war in which the Battle of France was one part. De Gaulle invited French soldiers and civilians to contact him.

Translation of the speech

Reception and influence

After the war, de Gaulle's 18 June broadcast was often identified as the beginning of the French Resistance, and the beginning of the process of liberating France from the yoke of German occupation. The speech began de Gaulle's entire future career, what he later described as his "legitimacy". He was the first French public figure to oppose an armistice with Germany, and the speech gave reasons why continuing to fight the war was not hopeless.

Although the 18 June speech is among the most famous in French history, few French listeners heard it; most accounts of having heard it are false memories. It was broadcast on the BBC, a British radio station, which did not retain the unimportant recording. The broadcast, practically unannounced, was by an obscure brigadier general who had only recently been appointed as a junior minister. Consequently, of the 10,000 French citizens in Britain, only 300 volunteered. Of the more than 100,000 soldiers temporarily on British soil, most of them recently evacuated from Norway or Dunkirk, only 7,000 stayed on to join de Gaulle. The rest returned to France and were quickly made prisoners of war. However, de Gaulle's speech was undeniably influential and provided motivation for the people of France and for the oppressed people of the rest of Europe.

The French and Swiss governments recorded the speech as broadcast in written form. The Swiss published the text for their own uses on 19 June. The manuscript of the speech, as well as the recording of the 22 June speech, were nominated on 18 June 2005 for inclusion in UNESCO's Memory of the World Register by the BBC, which called it "one of the most remarkable pieces in the history of radio broadcasting".

The themes of the speech would be reused throughout the war to inspire the French people to resist German occupation. Four days later, de Gaulle delivered a speech that largely reiterated the points made in his 18 June speech, and the second speech was heard by a larger audience in France. The content of the 22 June speech is often confused for that of 18 June. Variations of this poster would be produced and displayed in Africa, South America and France itself over the course of the war.

The 70th anniversary of the speech was marked in 2010 by the issuing of a postage stamp (designed by Georges Mathieu) and a €2 commemorative coin.

In 2023,  commissioned a recreation of the speech using artificial intelligence to replicate de Gaulle's voice, using a German-language transcription of the speech in Swiss military archives to find the French record of the speech closest to the original and recording a reading of the speech by François Morel as "base audio" to be modified by vocal synthesis to be closer to de Gaulle's voice.

France has lost a battle, but has not lost the war

De Gaulle's famous quote: "" ("France has lost a battle, but France has not lost the war") is often associated with the Appeal of 18 June. While the Appeal's themes are consistent with the quote, it is from a motivational poster featuring de Gaulle, which was distributed all over London on 3 August 1940.

See also
Liberation of France
 – Belgian resistance group purportedly formed after the 18 June 1940 broadcast

References
Notes

Citations

External links
 The Appeal of 18 June – Official French website (in English)
 Elisabeth de Miribel : Appeal of 18 June
 Bibliography on the Appeal of 18 June 1940 at 

World War II speeches
Charles de Gaulle
French Resistance
1940 in France
1940 in London
Memory of the World Register
June 1940 events
1940 documents
1940s in the City of Westminster